The Väike Emajõgi is a river in southern Estonia that drains into Lake Võrtsjärv. The length of the river is 93.4 km.

References

Rivers of Estonia
Landforms of Valga County